Women in geology concerns the history and contributions of women to the field of geology. There has been a long history of women in the field, but they have tended to be under-represented. In the era before the eighteenth century, science and geological science had not been as formalized as they would become later. Hence early geologists tended to be informal observers and collectors, whether they were male or female. Notable examples of this period include Hildegard of Bingen who wrote works concerning stones and Barbara Uthmann who supervised her husband's mining operations after his death. Mrs. Uthmann was also a relative of Georg Agricola. In addition to these names varied aristocratic women had scientific collections of rocks or minerals.

In the nineteenth century a new professional class of geologists emerged that included women. In this period the British tended to have far more women of significance to geology.

In 1977 the Association for Women Geoscientists was formed.

Timeline of women in geology 
 1642: Martine Bertereau, first recorded woman mineralogist, was imprisoned in France on suspicion of witchcraft.
1824: Emma Hart Willard published Ancient Geography as a supplement to Woodbridge's System of Universal Geography.
1833: Mary Austin Holley remarked and published on the soils, water resources, minerals, and mountains of the Texas region.
1841: Orra White Hitchcock, Sarah Hall, and Mrs. Brooks were among the first women to illustrate geological publications.
 1865: Elizabeth Carne was elected the first female Fellow of the Royal Geological Society of Cornwall.
 1866: Mrs. Myers, Kate Andrews, and Harriet Huntsman's work appeared in the Illinois, Ohio, and Kansas survey reports respectively.
 1889: Mary Emilie Holmes became the first female Fellow of the Geological Society of America.
 1893: Florence Bascom became the second woman to earn her Ph.D in geology in the United States, and the first woman to receive a Ph.D from Johns Hopkins University. Geologists consider her to be the "first woman geologist in this country [America]."
 1896: Florence Bascom became the first woman to work for the United States Geological Survey.
 1901: Florence Bascom became the first female geologist to present a paper before the Geological Survey of Washington.
 1909: Alice Wilson became the first female geologist hired by the Geological Survey of Canada. She is widely credited as being the first Canadian woman geologist.
 1919: Women were first allowed to become Fellows of the Geological Society of London.
 1924: Florence Bascom became the first woman elected to the Council of the Geological Society of America.
 1936: Inge Lehmann discovered that the Earth has a solid inner core distinct from its molten outer core.
 1938: Alice Wilson became the first woman appointed as Fellow to the Royal Society of Canada.	
 1942: American geologist Marguerite Williams became the first African-American woman to receive a PhD in geology in the United States. She completed her doctorate, entitled A History of Erosion in the Anacostia Drainage Basin, at Catholic University.
 1943: Eileen Guppy was promoted to the rank of assistant geologist, therefore becoming the first female geology graduate appointed to the scientific staff of the British Geological Survey.
 1953: Alice Mary Weeks, and Mary E. Thompson of the United States Geological Survey, identified uranophane.
 1955: Moira Dunbar became the first female glaciologist to study sea ice from a Canadian icebreaker ship.
 1963: Elsa G. Vilmundardóttir completed her studies at Stockholm University and became the first female Icelandic geologist.
 1966: Eileen Guppy became the first female staff member of the British Geological Survey to be awarded an MBE.
 1967: Sue Arnold became the first female British Geological Survey person to go to sea on a research vessel.
 1969: Beris Cox became the first female paleontologist in the British Geological Survey.
 1971: Audrey Jackson became the first female field geologist in the British Geological Survey.
 1975: Female officers of the British Geological Survey no longer had to resign upon getting married.
 1977: The Association for Women Geoscientists was founded.
 1980: Geochemist Katsuko Saruhashi became the first woman elected to the Science Council of Japan.
 1982: Janet Watson became the first woman president of the Geological Society of London.
 1983: Geologist Sudipta Sengupta (and marine biologist Aditi Pant) became one of the first two Indian women to join an Antarctic expedition.
 1991: Doris Malkin Curtis became the first woman president of the Geological Society of America.
 1991: Indian geologist Sudipta Sengupta became the first woman scientist to receive the Shanti Swaroop Bhatnagar Award in the Earth Sciences category.
 1995: Karst in China: its Geomorphology and Environment by Marjorie Sweeting was published; it was the first comprehensive Western account of China's karst.
 1995: Jane Plant became the first female Deputy Director of the British Geological Survey.
 2010: Marcia McNutt became the first female director of the United States Geological Survey.
 2014: Maureen Raymo became the first woman to be awarded the Wollaston Medal, the highest award of the Geological Society of London.
 2016: Geophysicist Marcia McNutt became the first woman president of the American National Academy of Sciences.

Notable women geologists 
 Claudia Alexander - notable member of the Association for Women Geoscientists
 Florence Bascom - first woman hired by the United States Geological Survey
 Helen Belyea - Canadian geologist
 Jean Milton Berdan - geologist with the United States Geological Survey
 Mary Anning (1799–1847) - early British paleontologist
 Etheldred Benett - early female geologist in Britain
 Elizabeth Catherine Thomas Carne - early female geologist in Britain
 Margaret Crosfield - early English paleontologist and geologist
 Jane Francis - director of the British Antarctic Survey
Maria Matilda Ogilvie Gordon (1864–1939) - Scottish geologist and paleontologist, 1932 Lyell Medal
Rhea Graham - director of the US Bureau of Mines
 Robbie Gries - former president of the American Association of Petroleum Geologists
 Dorothy Hill - only female president of the Australian Academy of Science
 Rosemary Hutton – geophysicist and pioneer of magnetotellurics; researcher at the University of Edinburgh
 Miriam Kastner - distinguished Professor of Earth Sciences at University of California, San Diego, 2008 Maurice Ewing Medal
Marjorie Korringa - igneous petrologist, volcanologist, and structural geologist 
 Inge Lehmann - Danish seismologist who discovered the Earth's inner core
 Margaret Leinen - American paleoclimatologist, director of Scripps Institution of Oceanography
 Lorraine Lisiecki - American palaeoclimatologist
 Mary Horner Lyell - nineteenth-century British geologist
 Marcia McNutt - American geophysicist, former director of the United States Geological Survey, science adviser to the United States Secretary of the Interior and president and chief executive officer of the Monterey Bay Aquarium Research Institute
 Isabel P. Montañez - Distinguished Professor of Geosciences and Chancellor's Leadership Professor at University of California, Davis, President (2017-2018) of The Geological Society of America
 Marie Morisawa - American geomorphologist
 Helen Morningstar - American geologist, professor in Geology and Paleontology in Ohio State University, member of Phi Beta Kappa, Sigma Xi, the A.A.A.S. and the Paleontological Society of America
 Sharon Mosher - former President, Geological Society of America
 Alexandra Navrotsky - 1973 Alfred P. Sloan Fellowship, 1988 American Geophysical Union Fellow, 1997 Geological Society of America Fellow, 2006 Harry H. Hess Medal
 María Páramo - Colombian geologist and paleontologist
 Maureen Raymo - director of the Lamont–Doherty Core Repository at Lamont–Doherty Earth Observatory of Columbia University
 Sudipta Sengupta - professor in structural geology in Jadavpur University, Calcutta
 Ethel Shakespear - English geologist
 Norah Dowell Stearns - American hydrogeologist
 Dawn Sumner - American geologist, planetary scientist, and astrobiologist
 Marjorie Sweeting - lecturer at Oxford University and wrote the first comprehensive Western account of China's karst
 Marie Tharp - A discoverer of the Mid-ocean ridge
Susan E. Trumbore - member, US National Academy of Sciences, Director, Max Planck Institute for Biogeochemistry
 Janet Vida Watson - Lyell Medal, Bigsby Medal, and a past President of the Geological Society of London
 Dawn Wright - African-American marine geologist, fellow of American Association for the Advancement of Science, ALVIN diver
 Maria Zuber - E.A. Griswold Professor of Geophysics at Massachusetts Institute of Technology; 2012 Harry H. Hess Medal
  - Soviet geologist and discoverer of diamond deposits in the USSR
 Anna Missuna - Russian-born Polish geologist, mineralogist, and paleontologist

See also
 Women in science
 Women in the workforce

References

External links
 Association of Women Geoscientists

 
 
Women's studies